The 2021 MBC Drama Awards, presented by Munhwa Broadcasting Corporation (MBC). Kim Sung-joo hosted the award ceremony second year in succession. It was aired on December 30, 2021, at 21:00 (KST). Namgoong Min won the Grand Prize for The Veil.

Winners and nominees
Winners denoted in bold

Presenters

Performances

See also
 2021 KBS Drama Awards
 2021 SBS Drama Awards
 7th APAN Star Awards

References

External links
 

2021 television awards
MBC Drama Awards
2021 in South Korean television
December 2021 events in South Korea
MBC TV original programming